The 2020–21 New Hampshire Wildcats Men's ice hockey season was the 95th season of play for the program and the 37th season in the Hockey East conference. The Wildcats represented the University of New Hampshire and were coached by Mike Souza, in his 3rd season.

Season
As a result of the ongoing COVID-19 pandemic the entire college ice hockey season was delayed. Because the NCAA had previously announced that all winter sports athletes would retain whatever eligibility they possessed through at least the following year, none of New Hampshire's players would lose a season of play. However, the NCAA also approved a change in its transfer regulations that would allow players to transfer and play immediately rather than having to sit out a season, as the rules previously required.

After a good start to the season, UNH was bit by the injury bug. The team lost several key upperclassmen for extended periods, including team captain Charlie Kelleher. The Wildcats were able to play well in some of their games but the team went through an 8-game stretch where they couldn't win a single match. By the end of the season the team had gotten healthy again, but they sat 10th in the conference. UNH came alive in the Hockey East Tournament, knocking off long-time rival Maine 7–2 in the opening round. The Wildcats then took on the top team in the nation, Boston College and came close to pulling off a stunning upset, falling 2–3 in their final game of the year.

Jeremy Forman sat out the season.

Departures

Recruiting

Roster
As of February 12, 2021.

Standings

Schedule and Results

|-
!colspan=12 style=";" | Regular Season

|-
!colspan=12 style=";" |

Scoring statistics

Goaltending statistics

Rankings

USCHO did not release a poll in week 20.

Awards and honors

Players drafted into the NHL

2021 NHL Entry Draft

† incoming freshman

References

New Hampshire Wildcats men's ice hockey seasons
New Hampshire Wildcats
New Hampshire Wildcats
New Hampshire Wildcats
2021 in sports in New Hampshire
2020 in sports in New Hampshire